Bahareh (also Romanized as Bahāreh; also known as Bahārā) is a village in Kuh Mareh Sorkhi Rural District, Arzhan District, Shiraz County, Fars Province, Iran. At the 2006 census, its population was 40, in 6 families.

References 

Populated places in Shiraz County